Lucinda Bassett (born February 28, 1956) is an American self-help author and motivational speaker. Her book From Panic to Power: Proven Techniques to Calm Your Anxieties, Conquer Your Fears, and Put You in Control of Your Life is an international bestseller and has been translated into several languages.

Career 
Bassett developed a self-help program called "Attacking Anxiety and Depression" which was the subject of a study by the Journal of Clinical Psychology. The study of 176 participants found that roughly 50% of participants reported positive changes in their lives as a result of the program Bassett developed, which is comparable to the improvements made in private counseling with a licensed therapist.

Bassett has been a guest on talk shows such as Oprah Winfrey Show and The View. On July 17, 2016, she was featured in Prevention Magazine, alongside various celebrities such as poet Maya Angelou and Sharon Osbourne, in an article entitled "Why You Love Your Age."

Bassett founded the Midwest Center for Stress and Anxiety in 1984; she sold it in 2008 to focus on personal coaching. Her infomercial "Attacking Anxiety and Depression" is one of the longest-running infomercials in history.

In 2001, Bassett took part in a collaborative venture alongside Roberta Flack, Diana Krall, F. Murray Abraham, and Nona Hendryx, all of whom contributed a track to the meditation album "Visionary Path." Bassett narrated a track called "Mountains."

Works
 From Panic to Power: Proven Techniques to Calm Your Anxieties, Conquer Your Fears, and Put You in Control of Your Life, HarperCollins, 2013 
 The Solution : Conquer Your Fear, Control Your Future, Sterling, 2011 
 Life Without Limits: Clarify What You Want, Redefine Your Dreams, Become the Person You Want to Be, HarperCollins, 2001 
 Truth Be Told: A Memoir of Success, Suicide, and Survival, Sterling, 2013

References

External links
Official site
"Journal of Clinical Psychology" evaluation of Lucinda's program

Living people
American self-help writers
1956 births
American motivational writers
Women motivational writers
American motivational speakers
Women motivational speakers
American women non-fiction writers
Self-help writers
21st-century American women